A tumblewing or "tumble wing" or "tumbling wing" is a glider or kite wing design which rotates about an axis transverse to the apparent wind, not necessarily horizontal. Tumble wings are frequently employed in wind turbines (such as the Savonius design), and are also used in some types of confetti. 

Tumble wings may be made of any material that supports some stiffness for form, such as paper, plastic, metal, composites or wood. Many leaves falling from trees become tumble wing gliders.

Tumbling wings generate lift by alternately flying and stalling as the angle of incidence changes with the spinning motion (see magnus effect and flettner rotor). Its mode of flight is more akin to confetti than traditional fixed-wing aircraft; however, several model aircraft, such as flettner airplanes, have been built with tumbling wings for lift. Tumble wings are employed as the wing of kite systems, a type of rotary kite, and many such patents exist.

Because it has no need for ballast, the tumblewing design has a lower wing loading and makes a good walkalong glider which is easy to make and fly.

See also

References

External links

  The Vortex I a Tumblewing Glider
 The Paper Airplane Guy teaches how to make the Tumbling Wing
 Tumblewing instructions from sciencetoymaker.org
 How to build and fly a Big Mouth type tumblewing
 How to fly a tumblewing type glider
 Video of Radio Controlled Airplane with tumbling wings
 Video of Dihedral Magnus Effect Glider

Model aircraft